Vannucchi is a surname. Notable people with the surname include:
Anton Maria Vannucchi (1724 – 1792), Italian lawyer
Aldo Vannucchi (born 1928), Brazilian educator
Gianmarco Vannucchi (born 1995), Italian footballer 
Ighli Vannucchi (born 1977), Italian footballer
Luigi Vannucchi (1930–1978), Italian actor

See also
Vannucci